Rolls-Royce Rugby Football Club is an English rugby union based in Derby. The first XV currently plays in Midlands 3 East (North).

External links
  Rolls-Royce Rugby Club

Rolls-Royce
Sport in Derby
English rugby union teams
Rugby clubs established in 1944
Rugby union in Derbyshire